Doniger is a surname. Notable people with the surname include:

Sundel Doniger (1888–1972), Polish-born American businessman
Walter Doniger (1917–2011), American film and television director
Wendy Doniger (born 1940), American Indologist

See also
David D. Doniger & Company